Paul Auguste Gombault (21 January 1786 in Orléans – 1853) was a 19th-century French playwright.

His plays were presented at the Théâtre Comte, the Théâtre des Délassements-Comiques and the Théâtre de la Gaîté.

Works 
1806: La Revue des Gobe-Mouches, ou, les visites du jour de l'an, one-act folie-épisodique, in vaudevilles, with Alexandre Fursy
1816: Le Soldat d'Henri IV, one-act play, mingled with vaudevilles
1823: Le Petit chaperon rouge, conte en action mingled with couplets, with Étienne-Junien de Champeaux
1823: Le Petit clerc, one-act comédie en vaudeville, with Charles-Maurice Descombes
1824: Les Sœurs de lait, scènes morales, mingled with couplets, with Eugène Hyacinthe Laffillard
1824: Le Tambour de Logrono, ou Jeunesse et valeur, one-act historical tableau, mingled with couplets, with Pierre Capelle
1825: Le Couronnement au village, ou la Route de Reims, à propos mingled with couplets, with Laffillard
1825: Croisée à louer, ou Un jour à Reims, tableau mingled with vaudevilles, with Laffillard
1827: Finette, ou l'Adroite princesse, folie-féerie mingled with couplets, after the contes de Perrault, with Laffillard and Jules Dulong
1827: La Petite somnambule ou Coquetterie et gourmandise, vaudeville in 3 tableaux, with Laffillard
1827: Le Petit marchand, ou Chacun son commerce, vaudeville in 1 act, from a tale by Ducray-Duménil, with Auguste Imbert and Laffillard
1829: Un Jour d'audience, vaudeville en 1 acte, imitated from the Tales of Bouilly
1830: Les Deux Mousses, drama in three tableaux, mingled with song and dance, extravaganza, with Maurice Alhoy
1830: Napoléon à Brienne, pronostic, mingled with couplets
1851: Le Père Joseph, three-act comedy, mingled with couplets

Bibliography 
 Joseph-Marie Quérard, La France littéraire ou Dictionnaire bibliographique des savants..., 1829,  (read online)

References 

19th-century French dramatists and playwrights
1786 births
Writers from Orléans
1853 deaths